Danis Zinnurovich Zaripov (born 26 March 1981) is a Russian former professional ice hockey left winger who played in the Kontinental Hockey League (KHL) with Ak Bars Kazan and Metallurg Magnitogorsk. Zaripov was also a member of the Russia men's national ice hockey team for the 2010 Winter Olympics.

Playing career
Zaripov  won the Gagarin Cup five times (2009, 2010, 2014, 2016, 2018). In 2017, Zaripov was banned from the IIHF through 2019 for testing positive for pseudoephedrine, an ingredient commonly found in allergy medicine and nasal decongestants. He had expressed interest in playing in the National Hockey League, which does not ban the substance, however continued his career in the KHL.

During the 2022–23 season, his 26th professional season, Zaripov having battled through injury and unable to rediscover his offensive contributions opted to immediately conclude his professional career, following captaining Ak Bars in a game against former club Metallurg Magnitogorsk, on 24 February 2023.

Personal
He has a son Arthur with his wife, Tatiana, with whom he has been in a relationship since the year 2000.

Career statistics

Regular season and playoffs

International

Awards and honors

References

External links

1981 births
Ak Bars Kazan players
HC Mechel players
Ice hockey players at the 2010 Winter Olympics
Living people
Metallurg Magnitogorsk players
Olympic ice hockey players of Russia
Sportspeople from Chelyabinsk
Russian ice hockey left wingers
Swift Current Broncos players
Tatar people of Russia
Tatar sportspeople
Russian sportspeople in doping cases